The Stockade-athon 15K is a road running competition held annually in November in Schenectady, New York and over 1,000 runners participate. It is in the top 10 oldest 15K road races in the United States.

External links
 unofficial web page

Schenectady, New York
Sports competitions in New York (state)
15K runs
Road running competitions in the United States
Sports in Schenectady County, New York